Camden County Airport  is a privately owned, public use airport in Camden County, New Jersey, United States. It is located one nautical mile (2 km) southwest of the central business district of Berlin, New Jersey. The airport was established in March 1929.

Facilities and aircraft 
Camden County Airport covers an area of 75 acres (30 ha) at an elevation of 149 feet (45 m) above mean sea level. It has one runway designated 5/23 with an asphalt surface measuring 3,094 by 45 feet (943 x 14 m).

For the 12-month period ending January 1, 2012, the airport had 3,181 general aviation aircraft operations, an average of 265 per month. At that time there were 25 aircraft based at this airport, all single-engine.

See also 
 List of airports in New Jersey

References

External links 
 Camden County Airport (19N) from New Jersey DOT Airport Directory
 Aerial image as of March 1995 from USGS The National Map
 

Airports in New Jersey
Transportation buildings and structures in Camden County, New Jersey
Airports established in 1929
1929 establishments in New Jersey